The Niger–Nigeria border is  in length and runs from the tripoint with Benin in the west to the tripoint with Chad in the east.

Description
The border starts in the west at Beninese tripoint in the Niger river, then proceeds overland in a northwards direction, before turning eastwards in a broad arc. The border then proceeds eastwards in a broadly eastwards direction, though with considerable undulation, before reaching the Komadougou Yobe river; the boundary then follows this river eastwards to the tripoint with Chad in Lake Chad. The border cuts through the densely-populated cultural region known as Hausaland, with Hausa speakers forming the majority on both sides of the frontier.

History
The border first emerged during the Scramble for Africa, a period of intense competition between European powers in the later 19th century for territory and influence in Africa. The process culminated in the Berlin Conference of 1884, in which the European nations concerned agreed upon their respective territorial claims and the rules of engagements going forward. As a result of this France gained control of the upper valley of the Niger River (roughly equivalent to the areas of modern Mali and Niger). Meanwhile Britain, which had (via the Royal Niger Company) administered the area around Lagos since 1861 and the Oil River Protectorate (Calabar are the surrounding area) since 1884, would have priority in the areas south of the upper Niger region. From their respective bases both nations gradually extended their rule into the interior. France has conquered the area of modern Niger in 1900; initially ruled as a military territory, it was later included within the federal colony of French West Africa (Afrique occidentale française, abbreviated AOF). The British likewise extended their rule inland from their Lagos and Calabar bases, forming two additional colonies - the Southern Nigeria Protectorate and the Northern Nigeria Protectorate. In 1900 rule of these areas was transferred to the British government, with the Northern and Southern (including Lagos and Calabar) protectorates united as the colony of Nigeria in 1914. Britain and France had signed a treaty on 5 August 1890, agreeing that their respective territories would be divided by a line from Say to Baroua near Lake Chad; this line was in general further north than the current border. This boundary line was further delimited in 1898, 1904 and 1906, being finalised at its current location in 1910. A series of beacons and markers were thereafter placed on the ground to physically demarcate the border.

After the Second World War both Britain and France committed to the decolonisation of their African territories. As a result Niger was granted independence in August 1960, followed by Nigeria in October 1960, at which point their mutual frontier became an international one between two sovereign states.

In recent years the border area has been heavily affected by the ongoing Boko Haram insurgency in north-east Nigeria, resulting in flows of cross-border refugees and a general state of lawlessness.

Settlements near the border

Niger

 Sabon Birni
 Bana
 Yelou
 Guéza
 Bei Bei
 Doumega
 Nassaraoua
 Tibiri
 Gofo
 Bazaga
 Birni-N'Konni
 Tsernaoua
 Doguerawa
 Kabobi
 Bangui
 Dan Mairi
 Serkin Toudou
 Maraka
 Bakoraouni
 Magaria
 Doumbari
 Gamdou
 Dunari
 Miskindi
 Toulatoula
 Faya Koura
 Mainé-Soroa
 Diffa
 Bosso

Nigeria

 Dolé
 Kamba
 Kokoba
 Maiyama
 Rafin Tsaka
 Nageda
 Kangiwa
 Kwalaye
 Lema
 Tagimba
 Jimojime Sule
 Tunugara
 Ruawuri
 Kalmalo
 Kwashebawa
 Djibia
 Katsina
 Dankama
 Mai'Adua
 Zango
 Rogogo
 Maribara
 Baure
 Babura
 Maigatari
 Galadi
 Machina
 Gumsi
 Meori
 Kurusalia
 Njikilamma
 Karagu
 Margawa
 Arege

Border crossings
There are numerous official border crossings, the main ones being Gaya-Kamba, Birni-N'Konni-Ilela, Dan-Issa-Katsina and Magaria-Mutum.

See also
 Niger-Nigeria relations

References

 
Borders of Niger
Borders of Nigeria
International borders